During World War II, losses of major items of equipment were substantial in many battles all throughout the war. Due to the expense of producing such equipment as replacements, many armies made an effort to recover and re-use enemy equipment that fell into their hands.

Equipment capture 
Soviet troops made use of German boots, knives, mess-kits, flashlights and other personal items such as shavers and sidearms. Likewise, German troops often sought Soviet winter boots (vаlenki) and hats. Troops on both sides each favored the other's submachine guns. German troops used Soviet PPSh-41 submachine guns and Red Army troops (and Soviet partisans) used captured German MP-40s.

After the Battle of Stalingrad in 1943, several hundred German Panzer III tanks and similar StuG III assault guns/tank destroyers were captured. A significant effort was made to repair and re-use them due to their widespread availability. More than 100 were rebuilt as the SU-76i self-propelled gun, with some even serving as Soviet SG-122 self-propelled howitzer vehicle prototypes. Besides Panzer IIIs and StuG IIIs, the Soviets also used about a hundred ex-German Panzer IV medium tanks as well as Panther tanks. Tiger I and II tanks seized by the Soviets were only largely used for testing rather than fighting on the frontline.

Nazi Germany fielded a large quantity of their own captured enemy weapons ranging from rifles to tanks. In particular, the German military used a number of T-34/76 tanks which fell into their hands early on in the war, as well as other older and lighter models such as the T-26 and a handful of the KV-series heavy tanks. Captured Soviet rifles and submachine guns were also operated by German soldiers, as were artillery guns of various types, such as the 76mm anti-tank/field gun, that were lost by the Soviet Red Army as they rapidly retreated eastwards all throughout 1941.

Use of captured equipment  
Captured equipment was valuable to the Soviets as a source of intelligence on German equipment capabilities and weaknesses. The first examples of German Tiger I tank and Königstiger tanks captured in combat were sent to Soviet proving grounds for evaluation. Photographic evidence does exist of usage of German equipment by the Soviets; ,they were often only used for a short period of time.

When Axis tanks were captured and could be repaired for use, they were often used in deception operations. A common tactic was for a Soviet tank unit to approach a German position using one or two captured German tanks in the lead. The hope was that the German defenders, recognizing a "friendly" tank, would not fire, or would delay their fire long enough for the Soviet unit to make a close approach.

Axis tanks and other AFVs were also re-marked and sometimes re-armed with Soviet weapons. One such example is the SU-76i assault gun based on captured Panzer III. Evidence also exists of German Panzer I-based command vehicles re-armed with Soviet 20mm ShVAK cannons.

Example listing of captured equipment

Captured German armored fighting vehicles
Panzer 38(t) medium tank
Sd.Kfz. 11 artillery tractor
Sd.Kfz. 250 armored halftrack
Panzer IV tank 
Sturmgeschütz III assault gun  
Panzer III tank.   
Tiger I tank
Tiger II tank 
Panther tank 
Sd.Kfz. 301 Borgward 
Panhard 178 ex-French armored car employed by the Germans
Panzer II light tank
Panzer I light tank

Example listing of other Axis vehicles
Hungarian Toldi light tank
Romanian R-1 tankette 
Romanian R-35 light tank

Captured aircraft
 Bücker Bü 133 Jungmeister
 Dornier Do 215
 Fieseler Fi 156 Storch
 Gotha Go 145
 Focke-Wulf Fw 190
 Focke-Wulf Fw 190 D-9
 Focke-Wulf Fw 189
 Heinkel He 111
 Messerschmitt Bf 109
 Henschel Hs 126

See also
 German designations of foreign artillery in World War II
 German designations of foreign firearms in World War II

References

Links
 Galleries of trophy armour, planes and guns at "War is over" site

Eastern European theatre of World War II
Eastern Front (World War II)
World War II military equipment of Germany
World War II military equipment of the Soviet Union